John Edward Chataway (March 3, 1947 – December 31, 2004) was a Canadian politician and Progressive Conservative Member of the Nova Scotia Legislative Assembly for Chester-St. Margaret's from July 1999 until his death, and a cabinet minister.

Early life and education
Chataway was a graduate of Waterloo Lutheran University (now Wilfrid Laurier University). He taught school in Nova Scotia and was a long-time municipal councillor.

Political career
After his election as MLA in 1999, Chataway was named Minister of Housing and Municipal Affairs, and Minister of Human Resources. Some of his constituents in Chester alleged he was a slum landlord, a charge he denied. Chataway sold his interests in the properties to take away any appearance or hint of a conflict of interest, but resigned the Housing and Municipal Affairs portfolio on September 23, after meeting with Premier John Hamm, where both agreed that his ability to carry out his duties, specifically in that portfolio, has been eroded. He retained the Human Resources portfolio and added the Environment portfolio in a December 1999 cabinet shuffle.

Death
His health had been in decline since a brain aneurysm in February 2000. He resigned from cabinet for health reasons in January 2001, but stayed on as MLA. He suffered a stroke while visiting his sister, Joan, in Toronto in December 2004, and died a few days later.

Personal life
He was a descendant of the Chataway who surveyed the Manitoba–Ontario border, distant cousin of Christopher Chataway, and a great admirer of Winston Churchill. He attended high school in Lindsay, Ontario, and was treasurer of the student council. His twin brother, Rick, was vice-president. Inspired by his cousin, Chris, he was a very good distance runner. Chataway was very active in historical preservation efforts in the Chester area. He was an excellent amateur auctioneer, much in demand for charity fundraisers.

References

1947 births
2004 deaths
Canadian people of English descent
Members of the Executive Council of Nova Scotia
Progressive Conservative Association of Nova Scotia MLAs
People from Fort Erie, Ontario
Canadian twins
Nova Scotia municipal councillors
21st-century Canadian politicians